Soad Hosny (January 26, 1943 – June 21, 2001) was an Egyptian actress born in Cairo, Egypt. She was known as the "Cinderella of Egyptian cinema" and one of the most influential actresses in Africa and the Arab world.

Feature films

Television series

See also 
 Top 100 Egyptian films.
Salah Zulfikar filmography.
 Faten Hamama filmography.

References 

Egyptian filmographies
Hosny, Soad